Jolen is a fictional character appearing in American comic books published by Marvel Comics. He is a member of the Inhumans and was part of the delegation sent to Earth.

Fictional character biography
No background history is known about Jolen, except that he is an Inhuman. In his first appearance, he is seen passing through the Terrigen Mist and gaining his superhuman abilities. He is then selected alongside a number of other youths to be sent to Earth on something like a foreign exchange program at the University of Wisconsin–Madison. He adjusts quickly to the conditions of Earth, but appears to have trouble understanding the nature of his peers, often overreacting to them. In reality, he hold deep contempt and hatred towards humans for unknown reasons and sees his inclusion into the program as being part of the Inhumans' first strike on Earth, subtly trying to convince his fellows to join his cause while murdering a number of human students to vent his frustrations.

After hearing from one of his friends that Nahrees, a former love interest, has been captured by Mister Chase, he quickly drives to Chicago where she is being held prisoner. Jolen confronts Mister Chase, a hired hitman, and is shot in the head. After a bit of scuffle, Jolen revives and uses a root to murder the hitman.

In response to a report of Terrigen crystals in New York City, Jolen is part of a team assembled by Gorgon to lead an assault on the reported owner of the crystals. During the mission, he reveals his true nature by mass-murdering all the hostages the team had been holding ransom in an opera house, enraging Gorgon who swears that Jolen will be held accountable for his crimes. The team is then confronted by the Fantastic Four and are quickly defeated. The Fantastic Four turned the Inhuman team over to the Office of National Security (ONE), where they were detained.

After being freed by Mala the Diviner and Dewoz, they retrieve the Terrigen crystals as well as capture the holder of the crystals, Dr. Cartwrite. Having accomplished their mission, they return to their moon base.

Powers and abilities
Due to his race, he is gifted with a number of abilities in addition to that of a normal human. Included in these abilities is an above-average lifespan, 150 years average, physical strength and speed greater than that of a peak-condition human athlete, above-average reflexes, and above-average endurance.

After passing through the Terrigen mists, he is granted plant-related abilities. Among these are the ability to control plants with his mind, grow plants by linking with them, and transform into a plant himself. He is also able to use plants as a means of travel by shrinking, then traveling through the plant's root system. He is also sometimes shown recovering from fatal wounds by transforming into a plant and letting the wound heal.

Appearances
A likely incomplete list of his appearances, credits included:

Inhumans vol. 4 #2 (July 2003) - Sean McKeever (writer), Matthew Clark (penciler), Nelson (inker), Tom Brevoort & Marc Sumerak (editors)
Inhumans vol. 4 #3-6 (Aug.–Nov. 2003) - Sean McKeever (writer), Matthew Clark (penciler), Nelson (inker), Marc Sumerak (editor)
Inhumans vol. 4 #7-8 (Dec. 2003-Jan. 2004) - Sean McKeever (writer), Robert Teranishi (penciler), Nelson (inker), Marc Sumerak (editor)
Inhumans vol. 4 #9-10 (April–May 2004) - Sean McKeever (writer), David Ross (penciler), Nelson & Scott Elmer (inkers), Marc Sumerak (editor)
Inhumans vol. 4 #11 (June 2004) - Sean McKeever (writer), David Ross & Doug Braithwaite (pencilers), Nelson & Rodney Ramos (inkers), Marc Sumerak (editor)
Inhumans vol. 4 #12 (July 2004) - Sean McKeever (writer), David Ross (penciler), Rodney Ramos (inker), Marc Sumerak (editor)
Son of M #3-4 (April–May 2006) - David Hine (writer), Roy Allan Martinez (penciler/inker), Tom Brevoort (editor)
Silent War #1 (March 2007) - David Hine (writer), Frazer Irving (penciler/inker), Stephen Wacker (editor)
Silent War #5 (July 2007) - David Hine (writer), Frazer Irving (penciler/inker), Stephen Wacker (editor)

References

External links

Jolen at the Marvel Database Project

Characters created by Sean McKeever
Comics characters introduced in 2003
Fictional characters who can morph animal or plant forms
Fictional characters with plant abilities
Marvel Comics characters with superhuman strength
Inhumans
Marvel Comics characters who are shapeshifters
Marvel Comics male superheroes
Marvel Comics plant characters